Without Reservations is a 1946 RKO Radio Pictures American comedy film directed by Mervyn LeRoy and starring Claudette Colbert, John Wayne and Don DeFore. The film was adapted by Andrew Solt from the novel Thanks, God! I'll Take It From Here by Jane Allen and Mae Livingston.

Plot
Successful author Christopher "Kit" Madden travels to Los Angeles to work on the film adaptation of her bestselling book Here is Tomorrow. The film was originally supposed to star Cary Grant as the Army Air Forces pilot hero Mark Winston and Lana Turner, but Grant has withdrawn and the producer wants an unknown actor to play Winston. On a train to Hollywood, Kit meets two Marine pilots, captain "Rusty" Thomas and first lieutenant "Dink" Watson. She considers Rusty the best choice to play Winston, but he is dismissive of her book, as she wrote a political allegory and he does not believe that Grant would refuse Turner for 400 pages. Unsure how he will react if he discovers that she is a famous writer, she keeps her identity secret, saying that her name is Kitty Kloch. After they are expelled from the train for drunkenness in a remote prairie town, they trade Rusty's German war souvenir for a car. They are welcomed at the farm of a large Hispanic family whose daughter showers attention on Rusty, but they flee following a misunderstanding. When Rusty finally learns Kit's true identity, he thinks that she has been using him just so that he will appear in the film. However, they eventually reach Hollywood and resolve their differences.

Cast
 Claudette Colbert as Christopher "Kit" Madden
 John Wayne as Capt. "Rusty" Thomas
 Don DeFore as 1st Lt. "Dink" Watson
 Anne Triola as Consuela "Connie" Callaghan
 Phil Brown as soldier
 Frank Puglia as Ortega
 Thurston Hall as Henry Baldwin
 Dona Drake as Dolores Ortega
 Fernando Alvarado as Mexican boy
 Charles Arnt as salesman
 Louella Parsons as herself
 Frank Wilcox as Jack
 Sam McDaniel as Freddy
 Lisa Golm as Alma

Cast notes:
Jack Benny, Dolores Moran, Raymond Burr and Cary Grant make uncredited cameo appearances, as does director Mervyn LeRoy.

Production
The film was originally budgeted at $1.1 million and was titled Thanks, God! I'll Take it from Here.

The Arrowhead Pictures motion-picture studio shown in the opening shot is the actual RKO Radio Pictures building at 780 Gower Street in Hollywood.

Reception
The film returned a profit of $342,000.

See also
 John Wayne filmography

References

External links
 
 
 
 

1946 films
1946 comedy films
American comedy films
American black-and-white films
Films scored by Roy Webb
Films about screenwriters
Films based on American novels
Films directed by Mervyn LeRoy
Rail transport films
RKO Pictures films
1940s English-language films
1940s American films